Hallström is a Swedish surname. Notable people with the surname include:

Charlie Hallstrom (1863–1949), Swedish Major League Baseball player
Donald L. Hallstrom (born 1949), a general authority of the LDS Church
Edward Hallstrom (1886–1970), Australian philanthropist and businessman
Fredrik Hallström (born 1966), Swedish curler
Holly Hallstrom (born 1952), model on The Price Is Right from 1977–1995
Ivar Hallström (1826–1901), Swedish composer
Johan Hallström (born 1976), Swedish actor
Jonas Hällström (born 1972) Swedish philatelist
Lasse Hallström (born 1946), Swedish film director
Leo Hällström (1936–2014), Finnish chess master
Mary Jeanne Hallstrom (1924–2006), American nurse and politician
Pär Hallström (born 1947), Swedish writer and academic
Per Hallström (1866–1960), Swedish writer
Peter Hallström (born 1965), Swedish songwriter
Rickard Hallström (born 1973), Swedish curler
Roland af Hällström (1905–1956), Finnish film director
Ron Hallstrom (born 1959), former American football guard
Sten Hallström, Swedish DJ and record producer

See also
2640 Hällström, main belt asteroid
Hallstrom House, historic house in Vero Beach, Florida

Swedish-language surnames